The V.League 1, also called Night Wolf V.League 1 due to sponsorship reasons, is the top professional football league in Vietnam, controlled by the Vietnam Professional Football Joint Stock Company. It is contested by 14 clubs who play each other on a home and away basis. The team finishing at the top at the end of the season is crowned the champion and enters the AFC Champions League.

The league was founded in 1980 as the All Vietnam Football Championship, with Tổng Cục Đường Sắt emerging as the first winner. The league turned professional in the 2000–01 season, which allowed clubs to hire foreign players. Vietnam Professional Football (VPF) was established in 2012, and the organising power was transferred from the Vietnam Football Federation (VFF) to Vietnam Professional Football Jointstock Company (VPF).

Viettel and Hanoi has won the title 6 times, the most among V-League clubs and Viettel also has total 19 national titles since 1954. Beside, Haiphong are the second with 13 total titles. The current champion is Hanoi which won the 2022 edition.

History

Pre-unification to 1979 
Vietnamese football league system has formed since 1955, while South Vietnamese leagues was formed in 1960. Since then, football leagues has been played in both sides despite the war situation back then. There was a big development in the number of teams, for example, Haiphong has 10 clubs back then. Haiphong Police has won 10 titles in the North, with Thể Công has also won 9.

From the beginning, Northern leagues has split into Division A and Division B.

After reunification, Vietnamese football leagues are played within the regional basis: Hồng Hà League in the North, Trường Sơn League in the Central and Cửu Long League in the South.

Seeing that there's too much constrains in organizing in regions, VFF used the 1979 season to reorganize the league system.

Foundation and early days
The V.League 1, as it is known today, starts its first season in 1980 when the first All Vietnam Football Championship was launched. Seventeen clubs participated in the competition (originally 18, but Thể Công withdrawn due to internal reasons) which was split into three groups and conducted more like a cup competition, with the winner from each group qualifying for the Championship Stage. Công An Hà Nội, Tổng Cục Đường Sắt and Hải Quan were the three teams to qualify, with Tổng Cục Đường Sắt ultimately taking the title. That format, although the teams were split into two groups, continued until 1995 when the league reverted to a more traditional league format.

Turning professional
League football in Vietnam would turn professional in the 2000–2001 season, which saw the league change its name to its current moniker, V-League 1. In that inaugural V-League 1 season, there were only ten clubs, with tighter restrictions meaning fewer teams. Over the next decade, the league grew from 10 teams to the current fourteen, with the team that finishes on top of the table qualifying for the AFC Champions League Group Stage. Clubs were allowed to hire foreign players from this season on.

VPF establishment
Following a season marred by accusations of refereeing corruption and a cover-up by the V.League governing body Vietnam Football Federation (VFF), six clubs (Đồng Tâm Long An, Hoàng Anh Gia Lai, Hanoi ACB, Vissai Ninh Bình, Khatoco Khánh Hòa and Lam Sơn Thanh Hóa) threatened to leave the league and form an entirely new league for the 2012 season. The most outspoken club in the move was Hanoi ACB, who were going through relegation from the V.League, with its chairman Nguyen Duc Kien announcing that ACB would spearhead the move. Due to the controversy, league sponsor EximBank expressed its intention to drop its title sponsorship of the league. League officials scrambled to resolve the issues, going as far as hiring foreign referees for the 2012 season. After a meeting on 29 September, representatives of the VFF and the 14 V.League 1 teams and 14 V.League 2 teams announced the formation of a new corporation, the VPF, Vietnam Professional Football Joint Stock Company to manage the V-League. The VFF would hold a 36% stake in the new corporation, and the rest would be held by clubs.

From the 2012 season, the organising power was transferred from the VFF to the VPF (Vietnamese Professional Football), and the V.League 1 was initially changed to the Super League, although this name was short-lived and the league was renamed back to V.League 1 later in the season. The first division was renamed the V.League 2. At the same time, many clubs found themselves in financial and sponsor issues, and many clubs withdrew, merge, bought another, or failed to meet requirements for leagues. As a result, the number of clubs in each league changed dramatically.

Season change
From 2023, the V.League will be finally restructured, with the 2023 V.League 1 season being the last season to be played from spring to autumn format. The same year, the 2023–24 V.League 1 season will also be played to mark the change, by playing from autumn 2023 to near summer 2024, in line with most of domestic leagues in the world.

Competition format
 The V.League 1 season starts in February/March and ends in September. In each season, each club plays each of the other clubs twice, once at home and another away, for a total of 26 games.
 Teams are ranked by total points, head-to-head, goal difference and goals scored.
 Top team qualifies for AFC Champions League Group stage.
 For 2010 season, two bottom teams are relegated to the Vietnam First Division while third lowest placed team goes to play-off with the third highest placed team from the First Division.
 Starting in the 2013 season, the number of clubs participating in the V.League 1 would be decreased from fourteen to twelve after three clubs failed to register. Also in the same season, the bottom team will be relegated to the First Division while the top three teams from the First Division will be promoted into the V-League 1.
 Starting in the 2015 season, the league is competed by 14 teams.

Sponsorship
Since the 2000–2001 season, the V.League 1 has been branded with a principal sponsor's name and logo. The following companies have acted as principal sponsors:

Controversies

2013 controversy
After Xuân Thành Sài Gòn was docked points for what the VFF deemed the club unsportsmanlike conduct when the club fielded a noncompetitive squad for their Matchday 20 meeting with Sông Lam Nghệ An, club officials announced that the club would withdraw from the league. On 22 August 2013, the VFF approved Xuân Thành Sài Gòn's withdrawal request. Matches where the club was involved were vacated. The VFF is still debating if the last place club will still be relegated to V.League 2, though the league charter states that the club in 12th place would be the only club relegated in the 2013 campaign.

Relegation was cancelled for the 2013 campaign after Xuân Thành Sài Gòn withdrew from the V.League 1 before the conclusion of the season. QNK Quảng Nam, Than Quảng Ninh and Hùng Vương An Giang, as winners, first runners-up and second runners-up respectively, were promoted from the 2013 V.League 2 season. Kienlongbank Kiên Giang failed to apply for the 2014 campaign and subsequently folded during the offseason.

2014 match-fixing scandal
Vissai Ninh Bình wrote to the Vietnam Football Federation (VFF) and to the Vietnam Professional Football Joint Stock Company to be allowed to stop their participation in the league and also the AFC Cup due to 13 players being involved in match fixing. They had played eight league matches and were third from bottom at the time. Following their withdrawal from the league, all their results were declared null and void.

Due to the match fixing scandal and withdrawal of Vissai Ninh Bình, it was decided that the bottom-placed team at the end of the season will take part in a play-off match against the third-placed team in the First Division for the right to play in the V-League next season.

Clubs

2023 season

Fourteen clubs compete in the V.League 1's, with two coming from the V.League 2's previous season:

a Founding member of the V.League 1
b Never been relegated from the V.League 1

Players

Rules on foreign players
Clubs are only allowed to register three foreign players per season. In prior seasons, clubs were allowed to register two foreign players.

Starting from 2015 season, the number of foreign players allowed for clubs is reduced to 2 players plus 1 naturalised player.

From 2019 season, the rules on foreign players changed again, the number of foreign players allowed by clubs are 3 players and 1 naturalised player.

Top scorers by season

Since the 2000 season, when foreign players could play in the league, the top goalscorers have always been foreign players (except Nguyễn Anh Đức from Becamex Bình Dương in 2017 season)

Statistics

List of champions
The following is a historical list of champions and runners-up of the V.League 1 by season. Superscripts in brackets (such as (2)) indicate a repeat win.

Seasons

All-time table

Youth League
In addition to the V-League, there is also a reserve youth League for U-19 players, with the aim to improve the quality of V-League and to become the future seeds for the clubs and national team themselves.

See also
 Vietnam Football Federation
 Football in Vietnam
 North Vietnam V-League and South Vietnam V-League – Before 1980
 List of football clubs in Vietnam
 List of top-division football clubs in AFC countries
 List of association football competitions

References
Notes

References

External links
 
 Vietnam Football Federation
 League at FIFA
 League at soccerway.com
 Vietnam – List of Champions at RSSSF
<noinclude>

 
1
Vietnam
Sports leagues established in 1980
1980 establishments in Vietnam